The 2017 City of Onkaparinga ATP Challenger was a professional tennis tournament played on hard courts. It was the third edition of the tournament and part of the 2017 ATP Challenger Tour. It took place in Happy Valley, Australia from 2 to 8 January 2017.

Main draw entrants

Seeds

 1 Rankings are as of December 26, 2016.

Other entrants
The following players received wildcards into the singles main draw:
 Omar Jasika
 Blake Mott
 Marc Polmans
 Max Purcell

The following player received entry into the singles main draw with a protected ranking:
 Matthias Bachinger

The following players received entry from the qualifying draw:
 Alex Bolt
 Alexander Bublik
 Luke Saville
 Yasutaka Uchiyama

Champions

Singles

 Peter Gojowczyk def.  Omar Jasika 6–3, 6–1.

Doubles

 Hans Podlipnik /  Max Schnur def.  Steven de Waard /  Marc Polmans 7–6(7–5), 4–6, [10–6].

External links
Official Website

City of Onkaparinga ATP Challenger
City of Onkaparinga ATP Challenger
2017 in Australian tennis